The 7th Golden Rooster Awards honoring the best in mainland China film of 1987, was given in Beijing.

Winners & Nominees

Special Award 
Special Jury Award
Film : The Last Frenzy
Comedy: 买买提外传
Director: Chen Kaige（King of The Children）
Actor: Liu Qiong（Death and The Maiden）

References

External links 
 The 7th Golden Rooster Awards

1987
1987 film awards
1987 in China
1980s in Chinese cinema